is the 30th series in Toei's Super Sentai series, a metaseries of Japanese tokusatsu programming. It was the first instalment to be broadcast in the 16:9 aspect ratio. It aired from February 19, 2006 to February 11, 2007, and was replaced by Juken Sentai Gekiranger. Its footage was used in the American series, Power Rangers Operation Overdrive and also dubbed into Korean for the South Korean series, Power Rangers Treasure Force.

Plot summary
Powerful relics known as the Precious appear throughout the world. Noticing these relics' power, various Negative Syndicates wish to take the Precious for themselves and utilize them for evil ends. To make sure that the Precious do not fall into the hands of the Negative Syndicates, the Search Guard Successor Foundation has developed its own special operations team, the Boukengers, whose mission is to collect the Precious and thwart the Negative Syndicates.

Characters

SGS

The  collects the Precious with help from the Boukengers.

He mostly battles Ryuoon of the Jyaryu Tribe.

He has a personal vendetta against Yaiba of Darkness of Dark Shadow.

He fights Shizuka of the Wind of Dark Shadow.

Her main reason for adventure is to discover more about her past. It is revealed that she is the last survivor of the Lemurian civilization. Her parents called her Ririna.

She often appears to be cold and emotionless, but cares for her teammates.

He mostly battles Gai (as either form) due to their bitter history. In Boukenger vs. Super Sentai, he embodies Hope.

They are led by Mister Voice, who serves as a liaison to the main SGS headquarters, and they are assisted by Makino Morino, who is the technical specialist of SGS and creator of the GoGo Vehicles, the mecha of the Boukengers.

Non-SGS Allies
 One of Satoru's ex-partners who went on an expedition with him years before.
 One of Satoru's ex-partners who went on an expedition with him years before.
 She had been seeking the treasures from The Tale of the Bamboo Cutter, crossing the Jyaryu Tribe while getting her fourth treasure, the Dragon's Neck Orb. She could have been Princess Kaguya herself.
 An elder from the Water Metropolis who didn't want to see any more of his people perish in the search for the Aqua Crystal.
 Magi's apprentice. Once a "Water human", he intended to finish what his father started to restore the Water Metropolis. He sacrificed his humanity in order to survive without water by discarding the "Proof of Water" crystal on his tiara (which Ryuoon crushed) and was transformed into a Wicked Dragon by Ryuoon, who used him to find the Aqua Crystal. Ragi's Wicked Dragon form's design is based on Bakuryū Sentai Abarangers Bachycelonagurus.
 Eiji's father. Dies fighting Gai.
 First appearing in Task 19, she is the only female Ashu and is Eiji's mother, as a result of her and Karato's sharing of forbidden love. She also appeared in Task 42 and Task 48.
 Souta's ex-partner from his times as a spy.
 Satoru's father and a legendary UMA hunter.
 Archeologist known as the only known researcher of the most ancient civilization known, Lemuria, as well as one of the only two men who can read Lemurian. Despises SGS for its "ambition", and treasure hunters because of the destruction of many ruins at their hands in search of Precious.
 A last-in-everything who was accepted in the Adventurer School after he was mistaken for Satoru. In class, he was always a target of Shirubegami's Chalk Attack as he was always screwing up.
 A mysterious boy who was born from a giant peach Satoru and Eiji find in a river. The boy develops at an incredible speed growing in one day what a normal human would grow in 10 years. It's later revealed that he was sent by the mountain in which the Mountain-Crushing Kanabō was hidden in order to recover it. He is a coward although still trying to take back the Precious. Eventually could gather courage from Satoru and Eiji and stand against the Questers. He is based upon the Japanese legend of Momotarō.
 A mysterious girl who claims to have been kissed and hugged by Souta and wants him to be with her. Souta doesn't remember her, but she insists that he was very kind to her. It's later revealed that she is actually a cat which by means of a piece of the Rainbow Cloth, transformed into a human in order to thank Souta for helping her fix her leg.
 A young girl Satoru met and who claims to be Santa Claus. She is attacked by Gajya in order to obtain the Golem, a Precious capable of destroying a large city. However, it turns out that Eve irresponsibly gave the Golem in its doll form to a boy named Kiyoshi much to Satoru's annoyance while they were on a "date" to find Golem. but Gajya found it first, reviving Golem to attack the Boukengers with then enlarged itself. When the battle against the Golem seemed lost, Eve remembered the way to defeat it and revealed it to the Boukengers. She later thanks the Boukenger for helping her, promising another date with Satoru, and she flies away on her reindeer-drawn sleigh.
 The embodiment of all of the past Red Sentai Warriors who gives Eiji the Super Sentai Address Book to find older Sentai members to fight Chronos.
Past Sentai Warriors They appeared in GoGo Boukenger vs. Super Sentai, much like the Dream Sentai in Hyakujuu Sentai Gaoranger vs. Super Sentai. Along with Eiji, they embodied the "6 Sentai Spirits." These 5 warriors represented Passion, Courage, Friendship, Justice, and Love respectively.
 The only female of the Ninpuu Sentai Hurricaneger, currently a pop star. Eiji came to her concert to enlist her help as she embodied Friendship.
 A resident of Dino Earth from Bakuryuu Sentai Abaranger, who gave the Abarangers the power to fight the Evolien menace. He embodies Passion.
 Nickname, . A super-elite member of the SPD who learned the true meaning of justice from his "Mentor" Ban of the Earth-branch Tokusou Sentai Dekaranger, to who Tetsu had himself assigned. He embodied Justice.
 The Ozu family's fourth child and a member of the Mahō Sentai Magiranger. His specialties are potions and the element of thunder. He embodied Courage.
 Tsubasa's brother-in-law, who taught him and his siblings the true potential of magic and fought by their side also he married Urara, Tsubasa's sister. He embodied Love.
Juken Sentai Gekiranger A group of martial artists with whom the Boukengers team up with in Juken Sentai Gekiranger vs. Boukenger.

Negative Syndicates
Not much is known about the  other than that they are individual organizations whose respective leaders, foot soldiers, and monsters try to steal the Precious and use them for evil deeds. This is the first series to have separate factions of villains since Seijuu Sentai Gingaman. Although there is some animosity between the member groups, they occasionally work together.
 Its sole survivor, intends to restore Goodomu its former glory by retrieving the Precious lost to them over the thousands of years they spent in slumber. Goodomu was the first and last Negative the Boukengers had to deal with.
Ryuoon returned in Gokaiger episode 21, the tribute to Boukenger.
 A ninja clan under Gekkou of Illusion who use old and new items to create monsters called  to help them gather Precious for profit. Dark Shadow resumed its wicked ways in the epilogue.
 Formerly of the demonic , Gai & Rei were revived by Gaja's Goodomu Engine after they were destroyed by the Boukengers and Eiji.

Precious
 are the dangerous treasures that the Boukengers and Negative are fighting over. For a relic to be considered Precious, it must be physically or technologically superior to any current human (or SGS-related) technology. The hand-held Accellular henshin devices use their half-open Scan Mode to determine the "Hazard Level" of each relic; the higher the number, the more important or dangerous the Precious is. Each relic that ends up in the Boukengers' hands is placed into a box that materializes from a card-like device.

Tasks (Episodes)

Production
The trademark for the series was filed by Toei Company on November 10, 2005.

The 30 Sentai Encyclopedia

The  is a series of featurettes that air at the end of each episode (Task) that honors each of its predecessors in the Super Sentai franchise, starting with Task 4. They looked back at each of the 29 previous teams, referencing various items within the older shows, and later on, wearing the costumes and using other props from the series, such as the "civilian" clothing. After covering themselves, they start a new series of segments called the  that cover milestones from the "First Gattai Robo" to the "First Sixth Hero" and then from the "First Multi Gattai" to the "Extra Heroes", playing an insert song from the respective series. The show's final segment (Task 48) covered its successor Juken Sentai Gekiranger.

The Greatest Precious
Episode 18 of Kamen Rider Kabuto showed a short preview for the Boukenger movie, and starting with Task 19, Boukenger showed its own previews. The movie is titled , which occurs between Tasks 28 and 29. It was released in theatres on August 5, 2006. A mysterious being called  awakens, announcing the Precious to whoever gets to her first, causing a 5-way confrontation between the Boukengers, Gajya, the Jyaryu, Dark Shadow and the Questers. Even Satoru's father,  is involved. But as Satoru learns while dealing with his father's ideals, the prize is more treacherous than the path to it.

GoGo Sentai Boukenger vs. Super Sentai

As with Gaoranger before it, Boukenger features a team-up special featuring five past Sentai members and a new hero, entitled .

The villain for this special, abducts all of the Boukenger, save for Eiji, into an alternate dimension. A warrior known as Aka Red contacts Eiji on Earth and provides him with a book that holds the names of all of the past warriors. He seeks the assistance of Tsubasa Ozu (Magi Yellow of Mahō Sentai Magiranger) at a boxing match, Tekkan "Tetsu" Aira (Deka Break of Tokusou Sentai Dekaranger) while he is undercover, Asuka (Abare Black of Bakuryū Sentai Abaranger) taking care of his daughter on Dino Earth, and Nanami Nono (Hurricane Blue of Ninpuu Sentai Hurricaneger) at her concert. They then fight Chronos who has purchased Goodomu Engines from Gajya in order to bring back Furabiijo from Hurricaneger, revive Duchess Org TsueTsue from Hyakujuu Sentai Gaoranger and Sorcery Priest Meemy of Magiranger. While the remaining Boukengers are in the other dimension, they meet up with Hikaru (Magi Shine of Magiranger) and Smoky, his cat genie, and try to find a way to escape. When Chronos turns Meemy, TsueTsue, and Furabiijo into a staff-like Precious with a Hazard Level of 666, Aka Red becomes a vessel for the six Sentai Spirits and allows for DaiVoyager to become . The events of the movie take place between Tasks 42 and 43.

Cast
: 
: 
: 
: 
: 
: 
: 
: 
: 
: 
: 
: 
: 
: 
: 
: 
: 
Narrator, Boukenger Equipment Voice:

Guest stars

: 
: 
: 
: 
: 
: 
: 
: 
: 
Natsuki's father (33 & 34): 
Natsuki's mother (33 & 34): 
: 
: 
: 
:

International Broadcasts and Home Video
This series was limited to only airing in other Asian regions, as most around the world have aired the Power Rangers adaptation, Power Rangers Operation Overdrive instead.
In South Korea, the series was aired with a Korean dub in 2007 and aired under Power Rangers Treasure Force. (파워레인저 트레저포스)
In Thailand, the series was aired with a Thai dub with license rights by Rose Media Entertainment. It originally aired on Channel 5 and also the Gang Cartoon Channel starting from October 11, 2008 until 2009. Toon Town Entertainment also held the distribution rights to license the series to air on the True Spark channel on TrueVisions, while still using the same Thai dub and aired earlier from August 14, 2008 till October 21, 2008. It was also released on home video.
In the Chinese-speaking world, Both Mandarin (Taiwan dialect) and Cantonese dubs were produced and aired in Taiwan and Hong Kong respectively.
In Taiwan, the series aired with a Taiwanese Mandarin dub on November 23, 2008 until October 25, 2009 with all episodes dubbed, airing on GTV.
In Hong Kong, the series aired with a Cantonese Chinese dub on March 15, 2009 (a few months after Taiwan aired the Taiwanese Mandarin dub) on TVB Jade until March 7, 2010 with all episodes dubbed.
The series was released in Vietnam with a Vietnamese dub by Phuong Nam Film Studio under Boukenger - Đội Siêu nhân Sấm sét on VCD and DVD.

Songs
Opening theme

Lyrics: Yūho Iwasato
Composition: Nobuo Yamada
Arrangement: Seiichi Kyōda
Artist: NoB

Ending theme

Lyrics: Yūho Iwasato
Composition: YOFFY
Arrangement: Psychic Lover & Kenichirō Ōishi
Artist: Psychic Lover

Notes

References

External links

 at Super-Sentai.net

Super Sentai
Treasure hunt television series
2006 Japanese television series debuts
2007 Japanese television series endings
Japanese action television series
Japanese fantasy television series
Japanese science fiction television series